Houghton Point is a cape in Bayfield County, Wisconsin, in the United States.

History
Houghton Point was named for Douglass Houghton, an explorer of the Keweenaw Peninsula of Michigan.

References

Landforms of Bayfield County, Wisconsin
Headlands of the United States